"La Passion" is a song co-written and recorded by Italian DJ Gigi D'Agostino. It was released in October 2000 as the sixth single from his 1999 album L'Amour Toujours. It is a remix with some additional melodic variations of the song "Rectangle" by the French musician Jacno, which doesn't originally contain any vocals. Music producer and songwriter Carlo Montagner provides the vocals, which were heavily auto-tuned, as were many songs which followed Cher's trend during the early 2000s. D'Agostino has made various mixes for different albums. The song was a hit in Austria and Belgium, where it became a number 1 single.

Music video

The music video was directed by Markus Stummer and begins with Gigi D'Agostino stealing a CD in a music store and running away. There are many extras in this video doing day-to-day tasks and going about their daily life. As the video progresses further, the viewpoint changes from one character to another. The video then goes into a flashback at the end that again shows D'Agostino in the music store, which means that the story continues in an infinite loop.

Track listings

 CD single
 "La Passion" (medley with rectangle) (radio version) — 3:30
 "La Passion" (medley with rectangle) (album version) — 7:35

 CD maxi
 "La Passion" (new radio cut) — 2:58
 "La Passion" (radio cut) — 3:34
 "L'Amour toujours" (LP mix) — 7:35
 "Tecno fes" (E.P. II mix) — 7:04
 "Tanzen" (E.P. mix) — 4:59

 7" single
 "La Passion" (tanzen vision) — 7:04
 "La Passion" (medley with rectangle) — 7:35

 CD maxi - Remixes
 "La Passion" (new radio cut) — 2:58
 "La Passion" (cielo mix) — 7:25
 "La Passion" (radio cut) — 3:34
 "La Passion" (l'amour toujours LP mix) — 7:35
 "La Passion" (tecno fes E.P. mix) — 7:04
 "La Passion" (tanzen E.P. mix) — 4:59

Personnel
 Written by Gigi D'Agostino and Jacno
 Arranged and mixed by Gigi D'Agostino and Paolo Sandrini
 Executive producer: Gianfranco Bortolotti
 Produced by Gigi D'Agostino
 Vocals (uncredited) by Carlo Montagner

Charts and sales

Weekly charts

Year-end charts

Decade-end charts

Certifications

See also
List of number-one hits of 2000 (Austria)
Ultratop 50 number-one hits of 2001

References

Number-one singles in Austria
Ultratop 50 Singles (Flanders) number-one singles
Gigi D'Agostino songs
2000 singles
1999 songs
ZYX Music singles
Songs written by Gigi D'Agostino